Nazir Hoosein (1940 or 1941 – 12 May 2019) was an Indian racing driver and motorsport administrator. He was the President of the Motorsports Association of India, Vice President of the FIA for Sport, chief steward of the World Rally Championship and a member of the World Motor Sport Council.

In 1980 Hoosein founded the Himalayan Rally Association and started the Himalayan Rally, run through the world's highest mountains in the north of India. He founded the Indian Automotive Racing Club as he was unhappy with the way that motorsport was organised in India, and then helped in the forming of the Federation of Motor Sport Clubs of India (FMSCI). He became President of the FMSCI in 1984.

In 1988 Hoosein organised the Great Desert-Himalaya Rally, which ran from the Thar Desert of Rajasthan through the Shivalik hills, Himachal and Ladakh. The event ended in Srinagar.

In 1993, Hoosein was elected to the World Motor Sport Council; however, in 1999 the FMSCI decided that it no longer wanted Hoosein to be their representative to the FIA. This led to Hoosein forming the Motorsports Association of India (MAI) in opposition to the FMSCI. Hoosein was an ally of FIA President Max Mosley, and assisted Mosley in gaining votes from the Asian members of the FIA throughout the 1990s.

In 1998, following the British Grand Prix where he was one of the 3 race stewards and the controversy surrounding the manner in which Schumacher won the race, Hoosein voluntarily surrendered his license to the FIA World Council, admitting that he and the other stewards were at fault for the mishandling of the situation. The FIA decided in 2000 that MAI should be recognised as motor sport's governing body in India. However, the Indian government refused to recognise the MAI, which meant that Hoosein was unable to represent India at the FIA. A deal was completed allowing Hoosein to be a member of the World Motor Sport Council representing People's Republic of China.

Hoosein was elected a Vice President of the FIA for Sport in 2005 as a member of the candidacy list of Max Mosley, who was re-elected as President of the FIA. The following year he was appointed the chief steward of the World Rally Championship. He has previously been a race steward for Formula One events.

Hoosein died on 12 May 2019 after a prolonged battle with illness. He was 78.

References 

Auto racing executives
Formula One people
World Rally Championship people
Indian motorsport people
Indian racing drivers
1940s births
2019 deaths
Year of birth uncertain